Sound of Your Heart may refer to:

The Sound of Your Heart (webcomic)
The Sound of Your Heart (TV series)
"Sound of Your Heart", by Shawn Hook  
"The Sound of Your Heart", by Eskimo Joe, Steve Parkin from Inshalla
"The Sound of Your Heart", by Four Year Strong from Four Year Strong